Baby Gloria (Gloria Mulungi Senyonjo) (born 28 October 2001) is a Ugandan gospel artist. She started singing at an age of two and a half years. In 2010, she won the Tumaini Musical Award, followed by the Olive Musical Award in 2011.

Background and education 
She was born to John Senyonjo and Betty Nakibuka, who is also a Ugandan gospel artist. John Senyonjo is the manager of Baby Gloria and Betty Nakibuka. Baby Gloria is the third born in the family and she went to Apollo Kaggwa primary school Mengo and later joined Life international school. She prays from Omega healing church in Namasuba, Wakiso district where Pastor Kyazze is the lead pastor.

Career 
Gloria released her first song called Mummy in 2005 and in the same year she release another song called Sisobola kukyawa. At the age of 14, Gloria held her first concert at Apollo Kaggwa primary school which was a charity concert and through this concert, she raised money to help the needy children in places of Luzira. Her next concert was held at Uganda National Museum in 2011. She is a musician, she is  dancer, guitarist, performer and a commercial brand ambassador of the Movit products, Lotions, Universities, Sanitary pads. She was also among the hosts of MTN Pulse Awards in 2020.

Discography 
Some of her songs:

Collaboration 
Some of her collaborations:

 DNA feat RUYONGA
 Save a life feat LEVIXONE

Personal life 
Baby Gloria runs a charity organization called Gloria Hearts which helps the less privileged children and she launched the charity organization in 2016.

Nominations and awards 
 Buzz Tenniez Awards, Best Gospel Song, 2019
 Hipipo MUSIC Awards 2018 (Nominated Twice).
 Best religious gospel singer.
 Best religious gospel Video (Mbu Ndi Lubuto).
 London African gospel awards nominations.

See Also 
Levixone

Ruyonga

External links 
Baby Gloria, the Glory to Fellow Kids.
MTN Pulse

References 

Living people
2001 births
Gospel singers
21st-century Ugandan women singers
Ganda people